Ibragim Berkmanovich Samadov (Ибрагим Беркманович Самадов) born July 18, 1968 in Pervomayskaya, Chechenskaya Respublika, USSR is a former Olympic weightlifter.  In transition at the end of the Soviet Union, he represented the Unified Team at the 1992 Olympics in the 82.5 kg division.

Samadov was the gold medalist at the 1991 World Weightlifting Championships, representing the Soviet Union with his superior clean and jerk evening his total weight with teammate Oleksandr Blyshchyk.  In 1992, Altymyrat Orazdurdyýew was the favorite, but was not selected for the Unified Team by coach and Russian national hero Vasily Alekseyev because Orazdurdiyev was from Turkmenistan, while Samadov was from Russia. Thus, Samadov was the new favorite.

The Olympic competition was the closest in history, with all three medalists tied with the same weight lifted. The first tiebreaker was the athlete's body weight and Samadov was .05 kg heavier, pushing him to the bronze medal position. The second tie breaker was based on which athlete had lifted their weight first and Samadov would have bested eventual winner, Greek Pyrros Dimas by lifting his snatch on his second lift to Dimas' third.

At the medal ceremony, Samadov refused to lean forward to accept his medal, instead taking it in his hand, before he dropped it to the podium and walked away to very loud boos.

The International Olympic Committee (IOC) disqualified Samadov and banned him for the rest of his life. Samadov apologized the following day but the medal was not awarded, either to him or to fourth place finisher Chon Chol-Ho, because the disqualification did not happen during the award ceremony. The IOC also refused to accept his apology, and he was also banned for life by IWF commissioner Gottfried Schödl.

He was ineligible for the Weightlifting Hall of Fame, since making a medal ceremony protest was an offence to the entire Olympic Games.

References

External links

1968 births
Living people
Russian Muslims
Olympic weightlifters of the Unified Team
Soviet male weightlifters
Weightlifters at the 1992 Summer Olympics
Competitors stripped of Summer Olympics medals
Chechen sportsmen
Sportspeople banned for life
Sportspeople convicted of crimes
Doping cases in weightlifting
European Weightlifting Championships medalists
World Weightlifting Championships medalists
Weightlifting coaches